Boardwalk Records is a record label founded by Neil Bogart in 1980, after PolyGram acquired Casablanca Records from him.

History
The label had hit acts with Joan Jett and Harry Chapin. Other artists on the Boardwalk label included, Invisible Mans Band, produced by Alex Masucci and Clarence Burke Jr.  Curtis Mayfield, Ohio Players, Richard "Dimples" Fields, Chris Christian, Night Ranger, Ringo Starr, Starpoint, Sunrize, Mike Love, Get Wet, Phil Seymour, Tierra, Carole Bayer Sager, and the soundtrack to the 1982 film Megaforce. Boardwalk Records also released the soundtrack for the 1980 film version of Popeye, which starred Robin Williams and Shelley Duvall.

Throughout its existence, Bellaphon Records served as Boardwalk's distributor in Germany, United Kingdom, Switzerland and Austria.

Chris Christian was the first artist signed to Boardwalk. In late 1981, "I Want You I Need You" became a #37 Top 40 Billboard pop hit and Top 10 A/C hit for Christian. Robert Kardashian, Kim Kardashian's father, was Christian's manager and was responsible for signing Christian to Boardwalk. Kardashian bought Christian's album from the estate, and it is currently owned by YMC Records.

A year after Bogart died of cancer in 1982, the label eventually closed down. The Boardwalk catalog was purchased by Tom Ficara from W. Jersey Bank, which held the mortgage to the titles prior to the Boardwalk bankruptcy.

Boardwalk Records was relaunched as part of The Boardwalk Entertainment Group in 2010 by Neil Bogart's sons, Evan Kidd Bogart and Timothy Bogart, and their partner, Gary A. Randall. Boardwalk's current roster includes ZZ Ward, Wallpaper., and Nova Rockafeller In October 2019, Boardwalk sold the Ricky Reed catalogue to Anthem Entertainment.

See also
 List of record labels

References

American record labels
Record labels established in 1980
Record labels established in 2010
Pop record labels